Vee H Aviation Pty Ltd, operating as Link Airways, formerly known as Fly Corporate, is an Australian regional airline based at Brisbane Airport, Queensland. The airline operates scheduled regional passenger services in Queensland, New South Wales, Victoria, Tasmania and the Australian Capital Territory. Link Airways operates a fleet of Saab 340B Plus and Fairchild Metro 23 turboprop aircraft.

Overview 
Link Airways was launched as Fly Corporate in 2016 by Corporate Air, an existing air charter company that has been operating since 1972. The airline bases its aircraft at Brisbane Airport and Canberra Airport, from where it operates to regional destinations across Queensland, New South Wales, Victoria, and Tasmania. Additionally, the company has its own heavy maintenance facility at Goulburn Airport in New South Wales.

On 11 August 2020 the company rebranded from Fly Corporate to Link Airways.

In October 2020, Link Airways announced that it would begin scheduled flights between Canberra and Hobart (6 days per week) as well as Canberra and Newcastle (11 times per week). On 2 December 2021 it was announced Link Airways would operate flights for Virgin Australia on the Sydney to Canberra route from 30 January 2022 under a wet lease arrangement.

Fleet 

As of July 2022, the Link Airways fleet consists of the following aircraft:

Destinations
Link Airways operates to the following destinations:

Australian Capital Territory
Canberra
New South Wales
Armidale
Coffs Harbour
Dubbo
Inverell
Narrabri
Newcastle
Orange
Sydney
Tamworth
Wollongong
Queensland
Brisbane
Biloela
Bundaberg
Tasmania
Hobart
Victoria
Melbourne (Essendon)

Incidents and accidents
 On 21 November 2022, a Link Airways Saab 340B, registered VH-VEQ operating on behalf of Virgin Australia as flight VA-633 from Canberra to Sydney made an emergency landing shortly after takeoff. While accelerating on the runway, a ratchet strap used to secure the left-hand propellor while the aircraft is on the ground penetrated the side of the fuselage into the passenger cabin. The strap had not been removed before flight by the crew. The airline reported that the crew stopped the climb as soon as they became aware of the damage and aircraft landed safely seven minutes after departure, with no injuries to passengers. However, the Australian Federal Police reported that three passengers had been treated for minor injuries after landing. The Australian Transport Safety Bureau (ATSB) classified the occurrence as a serious incident and opened an investigation.

See also
List of airlines of Australia

References

External links
 
 

Airlines established in 2016
Australian companies established in 2016
Airlines of Australia
Companies based in Brisbane
Regional Aviation Association of Australia